Pallickal is located on the Mavelikkara -Kurathikadu-Kayamkulam road Alappuzha district of Kerala, India. Pallickal is close to KP Road.

Cities and towns in Alappuzha district